The Spark That Moves is Cancer Bats' sixth full-length album.
The Spark That Moves was released as a surprise on Friday 20 April 2018.

Track listing

Personnel
Cancer Bats
Liam Cormier – lead vocals
Jaye R. Schwarzer – bass, backing vocals
Scott Middleton – lead and rhythm guitars
Mike Peters – drums, percussion

Awards and nominations

References

2018 albums
Cancer Bats albums